Egbeda is a Local Government Area in Oyo State, Nigeria. Its headquarters are in the town of Egbeda. Egbeda local government was carved out Lagelu Local government in 1989. The postal code of the area is 200109

Demographics
It has an area of 191 km and a population of 281,573 at the 2006 census.

Government
Egbeda local government area is subdivided into 11 wards: Erunmu, Ayede/Alugbo/Koloko, Owo Baale/Kasumu, Olodan/Ajiwogbo, Olodo/Kumapayi I, Olodo II, Olodo III, Osegere/Awaye, Egbeda, Olode/Alakia, and Olubadan Estate.

The Local Government is headed by an elected chairman and 11 councillors elected from each ward.

The current traditional ruler is the Elegbeda of Egbeda Oba Victor Sunday Olatunde Okunola who is also a member of the Oyo State of Council of Obas and Chiefs.

References

Local Government Areas in Oyo State
Local Government Areas in Yorubaland